Ranford Road railway station is an under construction station on the Thornlie–Cockburn Link in Perth, Western Australia as part of Metronet. 

The station will include a bus interchange with 14 stands,
 and approximately 400 car parking spaces. Situated in a cutting  lower than Ranford Road, the station will be accessed from a precinct entry road off the proposed Jandakot Airport Eastern Link Road. Approximately 1,985 daily boardings are predicted at Ranford Road railway station in 2031.

History
A station at Ranford Road, referred to during planning as Canning Vale station, was first proposed as part of the planned Armadale line branch route of the Mandurah line. This station was ultimately not constructed as the final route was altered to a different alignment.

Construction of the station started in 2020. The first trains 

At the 2021–22 State Budget, it was announced that the Thornlie–Cockburn link had been deferred by 12 months, as a result of Western Australia's skills shortage. This was alongside the deferment of 15 other state government infrastructure projects. The revised opening date

Controversy
There is a "significant history of odour complaints associated with the [nearby] RRRC since operations first commenced in early 2003," and as recently as 2016 it was "fined $50,000 for emitting unreasonable odours, and having to pay $130,000 in costs to" the Department of Environment Regulation after being convicted of "emitting an odour that unreasonably interfered with the welfare, convenience, comfort or amenity of a number of members of the Leeming residential community." However, after being given an ultimatum of "six months to fix the odour issue or risk closure" following years of complaints from the community and an action group formed by the community, the SMRC has made "substantial improvements to its systems at the RRRC since 2012."

References

External links
 Thornlie-Cockburn Link website page for Ranford Road and Nicholson Road railway stations.

Proposed railway stations in Perth, Western Australia